Rohit Jhanjhariya (born 18 August 1990) is an Indian cricketer. He made his Twenty20 debut for Nagaland in the 2018–19 Syed Mushtaq Ali Trophy on 21 February 2019.

References

External links
 

1990 births
Living people
Indian cricketers
Nagaland cricketers
Place of birth missing (living people)